Jeff Currier is an American fly fisherman born in Massachusetts in 1965 and is presently living in Idaho.

Currier's notoriety as an angler is largely due to his frequent public speaking engagement, his writings, his travels, and his fly fishing-related art. Currier's art is largely fish species-based, and in addition to selling his artwork on glassware and mugs, he also paints and draws on coolers, fly boxes, and other surfaces.

Currier's interest in species has led him all over the world for several decades. Having caught nearly 400 different fish species, Jeff Currier is one of fly fishing's most accomplished anglers in history.

Known as one of fly fishing's most well-traveled anglers, some of Currier's travels have been featured in several fly fishing films, including Waypoints, where Currier fly fishes in India, and Turning Points North, where Currier ventures to Saskatchewan for northern pike.

Achievements
Currier won the individual bronze medal at the 2003 World Flyfishing Championships in Jaca, Spain, which made him the first American ever to win a medal at the championships. He has also won the Jackson Hole One Fly Contest.

References

1965 births
Living people
American fishers